Bentham may refer to:

 Bentham, Gloucestershire in Badgeworth
 Bentham, North Yorkshire
 Bentham (surname)
 Bentham (One Piece), a character in Eiichiro Oda's manga One Piece
 Bentham Grammar School, in North Yorkshire
 Bentham House, housing the University College London Faculty of Laws
 Bentham railway station, in North Yorkshire
 Bentham Science Publishers, scientific publisher in the United Arab Emirates

See also
 Betham